The 2012 Scottish Youth Cup Final was the final match of the 2011–12 Scottish Youth Cup, the 28th season of the Scottish Youth Cup. It was played by the U19 sides of Celtic and Queen of the South.

Route to the Final

Celtic 

Celtic entered the competition in the Third Round where they came up against fellow SPL club Kilmarnock. Two early goals from Paul George and Callum McGregor set the tone for the match with a double from captain Jackson Irvine and a late strike from John Herron completing the scoring. Celtic then beat Dunfermline by the same scoreline in the fourth round of the cup. This time goals from Irvine, Atajic, Chalmers, Twardzik and Watt ensured their progression into the Quarter-Final stage where they came up against Aberdeen. Two goals from Filip Twardzik, as well as solitary goals from striker Tony Watt and John Heron saw off the challenge from the Dons'. In the semi-final, Celtic came from behind to book their place in their third consecutive Youth Cup Final. Two goals from Tony Watt and single strikes from John Heron and Filip Twardzik saw Celtic record a 4–1 victory over the Paisley outfit. This victory came at a cost, as top scorer Tony Watt was sent off after picking up two yellow cards, and thus missed the Youth Cup Final.

Queen of the South 

Queen of the South made it to the final of the Youth Cup for the second time in their youth team's history. They overcame a South Group game first, beating St Cuthbert Wanderers 7–1 in their first game of the competition. Queen's were then drawn away to Berwick Rangers, and despite going a goal down came back to win 3–2 and book a place in the Quarter Finals against Greenock Morton. Again, drawn away at Cappielow they beat their opposition by the same scoreline, with the aide of extra time. They booked their place in the semi-finals of the youth cup seeing off rivals Ayr United 2–1 at Palmerston Park. After their initial semi-final against Dundee United was called off, it was re-arranged a week before the final itself in a game which had everything. Dundee United took the lead when Ryan Gauld latched onto a through ball before clinically slotting past the on-coming Queen's goalkeeper. Patrick Slattery equalised scoring direct from a corner, however Gauld regained United's lead with a brilliant curling finish from the edge of the box. Just after half-time Lewis Todd drew Queen's level with a fine drive from the edge of the box, before a double from Robert Thompson saw United take a 4–2 lead. However, two goals in the last ten minutes meant that the game would go into extra-time. First, Slattery grabbed his second of the game, before captain Scott Hooper converted a penalty with five minutes to go. Striker Gavin Reilly scored the winning goal, tapping in a cut-back from winger Dean Smith to send Queen's to their first final since 1986.

Match details 

5
Scottish Youth Cup finals
Scottish Youth Cup Final 2012